LHO could refer to:

 Lee Harvey Oswald
 Langho railway station, England; National Rail station code LHO.
 Live Human Organs (Cargo Code, see List of aviation, aerospace and aeronautical abbreviations)

See also
 Lho, village in Nepal
 Asian name Lho
 one of the Cree syllabics